The Disciplined Woman is a 1972 West German comedy film directed by Ernst Hofbauer and starring Astrid Frank, Esther Konrad and Heimo van Borg.

Cast
 Astrid Frank as Gudrun
 Esther Konrad
 Heimo van Borg as Achim
 Hansi Linder as Herself
 Margot Mahler as Emmi
 Rosl Mayr as Frau Kellermann
 Bernd Bergemann
 Ulrike Butz as Hanni
 Carmen Jäckel as Monika Seibold
 Monica Marc as Luise Biddinghaus
 Michael von Harbach
 Evelyne Traeger as Frl. Ullmann
 Hans Kern
 Iris Wobker
 Dietrich Kerky as Walter Herwig
 Jasmin Kompatscher
 Josef Moosholzer as Pauls Freund Otto
 Otto Storr
 Hans Terofal as Paul
 Dieter Assmann as Albrecht
 Norbert Losch
 Ruth Marcus
 Karel Otto as Albrecht's Boss
 Roman Skrobek as Otto Huber
 Anke Syring as Reporterin
 Felix Rakosi
 Claus Tinney as Mann vor Nachtclub
 Walter Buhse
 Claudia Höll as Uta Becker
 Astrid Boner as Krankenschwester
 Gernot Möhner as Horst Becker
 Jürgen Schilling as Kellner

References

Bibliography 
 Johan Daisne.Dictionnaire filmographique de la littérature mondiale, Volume 2. Storyscientia, 1975.

External links 
 

1972 films
1970s sex comedy films
German sex comedy films
West German films
1970s German-language films
Films directed by Ernst Hofbauer
German anthology films
Constantin Film films
1972 comedy films
1970s German films